Timothy Wesley Steele (born 1 December 1967) is an English former professional footballer who played as a midfielder for Bradford City, Exeter City, Hereford United, Shrewsbury Town, Stoke City and Wolverhampton Wanderers.

Steele began his career with Shrewsbury Town where he spent four years before moving to Wolverhampton Wanderers. He helped Wolves gain promotion in 1988–89 before he lost his place in the side to Andy Thompson. He joined Stoke City on loan in 1991–92 before leaving for Bradford City permanently in the summer of 1993. He then played for Hereford United and Exeter City.

Career
Steele was born in Coventry and started his playing career with Shrewsbury Town making his debut as a substitute at home to Fulham during the 1985–86 season he played eleven times in 1986–87 scoring once and then scored 4 goals in 37 matches in 1987–88 as the "Shrews" continued to avoid relegation. However they began the 1988–89 terribly and were well on their way to relegation. He left Shrewsbury in February 1989 in favour of a move to Wolverhampton Wanderers and under the management of Graham Turner Wolves won the Third Division title in 1988–89. Steele played in 15 matches in 1989–90 and 32 matches in 1990–91 but saw his place taken by Andy Thompson in December 1991. He joined Third Division Stoke City on loan in February 1992 and played seven matches for the "Potters" during the 1991–92 season scoring once in his final match against Exeter City. He was rarely used by Wolves in 1992–93 making just four appearances and was released at the end of the season.

He joined Bradford City with whom he played 14 times scoring once before signing for Hereford United in January 1994. He spent two and a half years at Edgar Street making 28 appearances scoring twice and ended his career with a season at Exeter City where he played 25 times scoring three goals.

In July 1997, Steele joined non-league side Tamworth. In an eventful five years with The Lambs, Steele briefly managed the team after the departure of Paul Hendrie, and even played a game in goal after goalkeeper Darren Acton was sent off for handling the ball outside of his area, Steele went on to keep a clean sheet. At the end of the 2000–01 season, Steele was released by Tamworth and went on to play for Sutton Coldfield Town, he has since retired.

Career statistics

Honours
Wolverhampton Wanderers
 Football League Third Division: 1988–89

References

External links

 

1967 births
Living people
English footballers
Association football midfielders
Shrewsbury Town F.C. players
Wolverhampton Wanderers F.C. players
Stoke City F.C. players
Bradford City A.F.C. players
Hereford United F.C. players
Exeter City F.C. players
Tamworth F.C. players
Sutton Coldfield Town F.C. players
English Football League players
English football managers
Tamworth F.C. managers